Dumitru Mustață (28 April 1929 – 1977) was a Romanian fencer. He competed in the individual and team sabre events at the 1960 Summer Olympics.

References

External links
 

1929 births
1977 deaths
Romanian male fencers
Romanian sabre fencers
Olympic fencers of Romania
Fencers at the 1960 Summer Olympics
20th-century Romanian people